Khandyga (Xaandıga) is an urban locality (an urban-type settlement) and the administrative center of Tomponsky District in the Sakha Republic, Russia,  northeast of Yakutsk, the capital of the republic. As of the 2010 Census, its population was 6,638.

Geography
Khandyga is located on the northeast corner of the Aldan River, by a bend where the river turns from north to west. The R504 Kolyma Highway passes through the town and the Ulakhan-Bom and Sette-Daban mountain ranges rise to the east.

History
It was founded in 1938 as a base for the construction of the Kolyma Highway towards Magadan.  During World War II, an airfield was built here for the Alaska-Siberian air route used to ferry American Lend-Lease aircraft to the Eastern Front. From 1951 until 1954, it served as a base for Yanstroy forced-labor camp of the gulag network.

In 1954, Khandyga became the administrative center of Tomponsky District. It was granted urban-type settlement status in 1957.

Administrative and municipal status
Within the framework of administrative divisions, the urban-type settlement of Khandyga serves as the administrative center of Tomponsky District. As an administrative division, it is incorporated within Tomponsky District as the Settlement of Khandyga. As a municipal division, the Settlement of Khandyga is incorporated within Tomponsky Municipal District as Khandyga Urban Settlement.

Transportation
There is a summer hydrofoil service to Yakutsk (The hydrofoil service was cancelled in 1998). Khandyga is also served by the Teply Klyuch Airport .

References

Notes

Sources
Igor Lebedev. Aviation Lend-Lease to Russia. Nova Publishers, 1997.
Official website of the Sakha Republic. Registry of the Administrative-Territorial Divisions of the Sakha Republic. Tomponsky District. 

Urban-type settlements in the Sakha Republic